Untermosel is a former Verbandsgemeinde ("collective municipality") in the district Mayen-Koblenz, in Rhineland-Palatinate, Germany. It is situated along the lower course of the river Mosel, south-west of Koblenz. The seat of the municipality was in Kobern-Gondorf. On 1 July 2014 it merged into the new Verbandsgemeinde Rhein-Mosel.

The Verbandsgemeinde Untermosel consisted of the following Ortsgemeinden ("local municipalities"):

 Alken 
 Brodenbach 
 Burgen 
 Dieblich 
 Hatzenport 
 Kobern-Gondorf
 Lehmen 
 Löf 
 Macken 
 Niederfell 
 Nörtershausen 
 Oberfell 
 Winningen
 Wolken 

Former Verbandsgemeinden in Rhineland-Palatinate